The National Drought Policy Commission was created by the United States National Drought Policy Act of 1998, to conduct a study of current federal, state, local and tribal drought preparedness, and review laws and programs to determine if deficiencies exist in current relief policies and resources.  The Commission issued a report to the President and Congress, Preparing for Drought in the 21st Century, May 2000.

References

External links
 Preparing for Drought in the 21st Century, May 2000

Droughts in the United States